John Rosengren (born July 24, 1964) is an American writer and author.

His feature articles, profiles and essays have appeared in more than 100 publications, including the Atavist, Atlantic, GQ, New Yorker, Reader's Digest, Runner's World, Sports Illustrated, Tennis, Washington Post magazine, and the Utne Reader. His ten books include The Fight of Their Lives: How Juan Marichal and John Roseboro Turned Baseball's Ugliest Brawl into a Story of Forgiveness and Redemption;  Hank Greenberg: The Hero of Heroes, the definitive biography of the most important American Jew of the 20th century; Blades of Glory: A Story of a Young Team Bred to Win, which chronicles a season spent with a successful Minnesota high school hockey team; and Hammerin' Hank, George Almighty and the Say Hey Kid: The Year that Changed Baseball Forever, an account of the 1973 baseball season. He also authored Esera Tuaolo's autobiography Alone in the Trenches: My Life as a Gay Man in the NFL. He has published two works of fiction, the short story collection Life Is Just a Party and the novel A Clean Heart.

Rosengren has won numerous awards for his books and magazine articles. His 10,000-word exposé in the Atlantic "How Casinos Enable Gambling Addicts" won the 2017 Donald Robinson Award for Investigative Journalism and was nominated for a National Magazine Award and a Pulitzer Prize.

Rosengren was born in Minneapolis, Minnesota. He holds a master's degree in creative writing from Boston University and a bachelor's degree from the University of Saint John's. He teaches occasionally at the University of Minnesota's journalism school. He is or has been a member of the American Society of Journalists and Authors, Biographers International Organization, the Hemingway Society and the Society for American Baseball Research.

Notes

External links
 JohnRosengren.net Official Page
 HankGreenberg.net Official Page
 FightofTheirLives.net Official Page

1964 births
Living people
Sportswriters from Minnesota
Writers from Minneapolis
Boston University College of Arts and Sciences alumni
Ice hockey people from Minnesota